Coleophora amygdalina is a moth of the family Coleophoridae that is endemic to Tajikistan.

References

External links

amygdalina
Moths of Asia
Endemic fauna of Tajikistan
Moths described in 1976